Ivan & The Parazol are a Hungarian indie-garage rock band based in Budapest, Hungary. The band incorporates influences from the 1960s and the 1970s. The band have played hundreds of gigs mainly all over Hungary with Heaven Street Seven and several shows in Europe or in The United States. The band's first hit was Take My Hand, which was a number one song for 10 weeks on the Hungarian national radio station, MR2 Petőfi Rádió.

History
The band was formed by Iván Vitáris (vocals), Máté Balla (guitars), János Tarnai (bass), István Beke (keyboards) and Bálint Simon (drums) in Budapest, Hungary.

In September 2010 the band shot the video called Marshall which resulted their nomination for the Hungarian Music Television in the category of brand new bands.

In October 2011, Ivan & The Parazol shot the video In Air. The song later became a number one song in the Hungarian radio station, Petőfi Rádió.

In January 2012 the band were invited to play an acoustic show at the MR2 Petőfi rádió's MR2 Acoustic series.

In January 2012 the band's first EP entitled Yellow Flavour was released including the Hungarian version of In Air entitled Jól Áll Nekem Az Élet (The Life Suits Me).

In 2014 their song called Together was the official anthem of Sziget Festival.

Mama Don't You Recognize Ivan & The Parazol?
In August 2012, the band hired Zoltán Takács as the producer of their first full-length studio album. The band recorded their album at the Abnormal Studios in Budapest with László Philipp as recording engineer.

In September 2012 the Drum & Monkey Records released Ivan & The Parazol's first album entitled Mama Don't You Recognize Ivan & The Parazol?. The outlay of the record was designed by Melinda Hujber.

On 13 March 2013, Ivan & The Parazol played at the South by Southwest festival in Austin, Texas, The United States.

On 8 August 2013, Ivan & The Parazol played at the Sziget Festival.

Band members

Current line-up
Iván Vitáris – lead vocals (2010–present)
Máté Balla – guitar (2010–present)
Bálint Simon – drums (2010–present)
Márton Springer – bass guitar (2017–present)

Former members
János Tarnai – bass guitar (2010–2017)
István Beke – keyboard (2010–2020)

Timeline

Discography

Singles
 Yellow Flavour (2012)
 Sellin' My Soul (2012)

Albums
 Mama Don't You Recognize Ivan & The Parazol? (2012)
 Mode Bizarre (2014)
 The All Right Nows (2015)
 Exotic Post Traumatic (2019)
 Budai Pop (2021)

Music videos

See also
Budapest indie music scene

References

External links

Official site
Ivan & The Parazol at Twitter
Ivan & The Parazol at ITunes
Ivan & The Parazol on Facebook
Ivan & The Parazol on YouTube
MR2 Statistics: Ivan and the Parazol

Musical groups established in 2010
Hungarian indie rock groups
2010 establishments in Hungary